The  is a cabinet level ministry in the government of Japan responsible for oversight of the agriculture, forestry and fishing industries. Its acronym is MAFF. The current Minister of Agriculture, Forestry and Fisheries is Taku Etō.

History
As an additional note, the Ministry of Agriculture and Commerce was a division that served as the Ministry of Agriculture, Forestry and Fisheries and the Ministry of Economy, Trade and Industry.

The ministry was also given responsibility for oversight of the Factory Act of 1903, which provided regulations for work hours and worker safety in both industrial and agricultural industries.

From 1943 to 1945, when the Ministry of Commerce was abolished due to the nationalization of Japanese industry for the war effort of World War II against Allies of World War II, parts of that ministry reverted to the Ministry of Agriculture and Forestry, which was again briefly named .

In 1978, the name of Ministry of Agriculture and Forestry was expanded to the Ministry of Agriculture, Forestry and Fisheries to better reflect the ministry's role in guaranteeing the Japanese public a safe food supply, and to protect producers and workers in the food production industries.

Organization

Internal Bureaus 

 Minister's Secretariat (大臣官房)
 Food Safety and Consumer Affairs Bureau (消費・安全局)
 Export and International Affairs Bureau (輸出・国際局)
 Crop Production Bureau (農産局)
 Livestock Industry Bureau (畜産局)
 Management Improvement Bureau (経営局)
 Rural Development Bureau (農村振興局)

Affiliated Agencies 

 Forestry Agency (林野庁)
 Fisheries Agency (水産庁)

List of ministers
The following list below is a list of notable ministers appointed since 1976.

Functional activities 
The primary function of the ministry is to set quality standards for food products, supervise commodity markets and food sales, and to undertake land reclamation and land improvement projects.

See also
Agriculture, forestry, and fishing in Japan
Agricultural Protectionism in Japan
Japan Agricultural Cooperatives
Office of Korea Rural Development
Korea Forest Service
Shokuiku

References

External links 

  
  

Agriculture, Forestry and Fisheries
Agricultural organizations based in Japan
Japan
Japan
Japan
Japan, Agriculture, Forestry and Fisheries
Forestry in Japan
1881 establishments in Japan